Johan Martin Holst (23 June 1892 – 17 February 1953) was a Norwegian physician, a surgeon and military doctor.

Personal life
Holst was born in Kristiania to physician Peter Fredrik Holst and Kirstine Eleonore Sartz Fürst. He was a nephew of Johan Throne Holst, and thus cousin of Henning Throne-Holst and Harald Throne-Holst. He married Sofie Steen in 1920.

Career
Holst graduated as physician in 1916, and as dr.med. in 1924. From 1930 he was appointed professor of surgery at Rikshospitalet. He published works on treatment of the Basedow disease and gastrointestinal diseases, and on surgical treatment of pulmonary tuberculosis. He headed the Norwegian Army Medical Service from 1940, with the rank of colonel. During the German occupation of Norway, he was among the early resistance pioneers (Milorg), and after he had to flee from the country, he was brought to London, where he served as head of the medical service of the exiled Norwegian military forces.

References

1892 births
1953 deaths
Physicians from Oslo
Norwegian surgeons
Norwegian military doctors
Norwegian resistance members
Norwegian expatriates in the United Kingdom
20th-century Norwegian physicians
Academic staff of the University of Oslo
20th-century surgeons
Norwegian Army personnel of World War II